The Hochstaufen is the easternmost mountain of the Chiemgau Alps, Germany. It is located in the north of Bad Reichenhall (Landkreis Berchtesgadener Land). The mountain belongs to the Staufen massif and is a popular destination for mountaineering.

In the 17th century there were some mines at the Hochstaufen, the best known gallery was the Doktor-Oswald-Gallery, located only 60 m underneath the summit.

At an altitude of 1,750 m is the Reichenhaller Haus, an alpine hut of the Deutscher Alpenverein (Section Bad Reichenhall).

Routes 
 Bad Reichenhall (Padinger Alm) – Barthlmahd – Reichenhaller Haus – Hochstaufen
 Bad Reichenhall (Padinger Alm) – Buchmahd – "Steinerne Jaeger" – Reichenhaller Haus – Hochstaufen
 Piding (Urwies or Mauthausen) – Mairalm – "Steinerne Jaeger" – Reichenhaller Haus – Hochstaufen
 Piding (Urwies or Mauthausen) – Mairalm – Pidinger Klettersteig (fixed rope route) – Hochstaufen
 Piding or Aufham-Anger – Steiner Alm – Hochstaufen
 Passage from Zwiesel – Zennokopf – Mittelstaufen – Reichenhaller Haus – Hochstaufen
 Passage from Zwieselalm – Barthlmahd – Reichenhaller Haus – Hochstaufen
 Passage from Fuderheuberg – "Steinerne Jaeger" – Reichenhaller Haus – Hochstaufen
The fixed rope route Pidinger Klettersteig was created in 2003 and is one of the most challenging fixed rope routes in Germany.

Miscellaneous 
After heavy rainfalls earthquakes occur at the Hochstaufen, so there are several seismometers of the Ludwig Maximilian University of Munich around the mountain.

In September 1993 the innkeeper couple of the Reichenhaller Haus was murdered in a brutal robbery.

External links

 German Alpine Association Section Bad Reichenhall (in German only)
 Description of the Pidinger Klettersteig (in German only)

Mountains of Bavaria
Mountains of the Alps
One-thousanders of Germany
Chiemgau Alps